Czesław Litwin (born 17 March 1955 in Głogów) is a Polish politician. He was elected to Sejm on 25 September 2005, getting 9902 votes in 1 Legnica district as a candidate from Samoobrona Rzeczpospolitej Polskiej list.

See also
Members of Polish Sejm from 2005 to 2007

External links
Czesław Litwin - parliamentary page - includes declarations of interest, voting record, and transcripts of speeches.

1955 births
Living people
People from Głogów
Members of the Polish Sejm 2005–2007
Self-Defence of the Republic of Poland politicians